Ahmadkhan (also Romanized as Aḩmadkhān; also known as Dom Tang) is a village in Zirtang Rural District, Kunani District, Kuhdasht County, Lorestan Province, Iran. At the 2006 census, its population was 50, in 9 families.

References 

Towns and villages in Kuhdasht County